The Co-operative and Community Benefit Societies Act 2014 (c.14) is an Act of the Parliament of the United Kingdom that received royal assent on 14 May 2014.

Provisions 
According to its long title, the Act consolidates certain enactments relating to co-operative societies, community benefit societies and other societies registered or treated as registered under the Industrial and Provident Societies Act 1965, with amendments to give effect to recommendations of the Law Commission and the Scottish Law Commission.

Effects
The Act renamed industrial and provident societies as co-operative or community benefit societies. The Act effectively implemented the renaming provisions first enacted in the Co-operative and Community Benefit Societies and Credit Unions Act 2010 and coincided with a number of other changes foreshadowed by the 2010 Act, such as the application of the Company Directors Disqualification Act 1986 to society directors (known as committee members in the legislation) by the commencement of section 3 of the 2010 Act from 1 April 2014.

Since 1 August 2014, a new society must register as either a co-operative or a community benefit society rather than, as had been the case, an industrial and provident society that met either requirement. Societies already registered before that date remain registered under the 2014 Act. Sections 1 and 2 provide that all three types of society (co-operative societies, community benefit societies and societies already registered before 1 August 2014) are referred to together as "registered societies". However, for administrative purposes, the three types of society are categorised separately. The Act applies to Great Britain but not Northern Ireland.

The 2014 Act consolidated previous legislation and modernised its language. Its enactment coincided with a number of reforms to the law applying to societies which were implemented by secondary legislation. They included the application of insolvency rescue procedures such as administration and creditors' voluntary arrangements, to societies by The Industrial and Provident Societies and Credit Unions (Arrangements, Reconstructions and Administration) Order 2014 SI 2014/229; increased Financial Conduct Authority (FCA) powers of investigation and inspection of societies under the Co-operative and Community Benefit Societies and Credit Unions (Investigations) Regulations 2014 SI 2014/574 and an increase in the holding limit for withdrawable shares in societies from £20,000 to £100,000 in s. 24 of the Act.

Societies are registered with the Financial Conduct Authority, which registers them and applies the statutory tests about whether a society meets on registration and continues to meet the requirements of s. 1 and 2 of the Act.

Co-operative and community benefit societies

Co-operative or community benefit societies may in general conduct any legal business. However, co-operative societies are restricted by section 2(3) of Co-operative and Community Benefit Societies Act 2014, which lays down that, for the purposes of the legislation, a "co-operative society" does not include "a society that carries on, or intends to carry on, business with the object of making profits mainly for the payment of interest, dividends or bonuses on money invested or deposited with, or lent to, the society or any other person".

Consumer, worker, agricultural and housing co-operatives, working men's clubs, Women's Institute markets, allotment societies, mutual investment companies, friendly societies and housing associations usually incorporate as societies, as do some social enterprises. This process is facilitated by the existence of "model rules" developed by various federal bodies, which reduce the legal costs. The Financial Conduct Authority maintains a list of these bodies which can be downloaded from their web site.

Credit unions and building societies, which sprang from the same roots, are now governed by specific legislation although credit unions are, through their legislation, registered under the 2014 Act - see the Credit Unions Act 1979 and the Building Societies Act 1986 and later legislation. Credit Unions and Building Societies are both regulated by the Prudential Regulation Authority as deposit takers.

Industrial and provident societies fell into two broad categories from 1939 to 2014. That is now reflected in the new registration system under Co-operative and Community Benefit Societies Act 2014
 Co-operatives – these trade for the mutual benefit of their members, and the Financial Conduct Authority (FCA) as registrar will judge the legality of their initial or continued registration by reference to co-operative principles (case law is very thin on the ground compared with that for companies);
 Community benefit societies (also known as 'societies for the benefit of the community' or 'bencoms') – these trade to benefit the broader community, and the FCA will refer to consider whether they satisfy that requirement by prohibiting any distribution of assets or profits to members and generally whether their aims are charitable or more widely philanthropic so as to offer "community benefit".

In 2015, the FCA was still consulting on draft guidelines about how it will apply the statutory requirements to societies.

At present those community benefit societies (in England and Wales) that meet the requirements for charitable status are accepted as such by the taxation authority, HM Revenue and Customs, rather than by the Charity Commission. This exempt charity status (the exemption is from registering  with the Commission) is gradually being removed for entities with no 'lead regulator'. However, the process was still not complete at 2015 according to the Charity Commission publication on Exempt Charities.

See also
 Co-operative and Community Benefit Societies and Credit Unions Act 2010
 Industrial and provident society

References

United Kingdom Acts of Parliament 2014
Co-operatives in the United Kingdom